Achu Rajamani often credited as Achu, is an Indian film score and soundtrack composer and singer. He has scored music for several Malayalam, Telugu and Tamil films. He made his music direction debut in the Telugu film Nenu Meeku Telusa...? in 2008.

Early life
Achu is the grandson of music director B. A. Chidambaranath who is considered to be one among the pioneers of the Malayalam music industry. His father, Rajamani, was also a music director who scored for more than 1000 films in Tamil, Telugu, Kannada and Malayalam languages. He is a graduate from Loyola College, Chennai.

Hailing from a musical family, Achu's natural interest was to become a pilot. He chose music over aviation and became a full-fledged musician. He also assisted prominent music director M. M. Keeravani for few years, before he became an independent Music Composer.

Career
Achu has worked as a keyboard programmer for 410 songs and has programmed background music for over 175 films. He is also a professional pianist and has accompanied his father playing the piano to many of his compositions. He first played keyboard for Bollywood film Chup Chup Ke (2006) directed by Priyadarshan. He was the called upon to score the background music for the Malayalam film Keerthi Chakra's sequel film Kurukshetra (2008). Achu's background music was well appreciated.

Following this short stint, Achu got his major break when he got to compose the songs and background score for the Telugu film Nenu Meeku Telusa...? (2008). His next work was for the Telugu remake of the Tamil film Polladhavan, named Kurradu (2009).

Apart from composing, Achu also worked as a playback singer. His song "Take It Easy" for the Malayalam film Happy Husbands composed by M. Jayachandran was among the major hits of 2010.

In 2012, Achu released his first full-fledged Tamil soundtrack for the film Maalai Pozhudhin Mayakathilaey. The album was very well received by critics and received the Album of the Year Award. His Telugu songs Bujji Pilla and Devatha from Potugadu and Padipoya from DK Bose were the biggest hits of 2013. His songs Siru Nadai and Hey Umayaal from the movie Urumeen(2015) were also superhits of the time.  His song Pondatti from the movie Golisoda 2 (2018)  was in the top list in the radio charts for over 11 weeks since its release in June 2018. 

Apart from composing and playback singing Achu was into professional racing from 2009 till 2012. He was also into sports events like sprint and had won numerous medals during his school days.  He took a break from films to pursue his racing career from 2009 till 2012. He was also a cricketer and had played for few years. In 2015, he made his debut as an actor with the Telugu film Gaddam Gang.

Discography

Composer

As singer 
Aakasame Haddu (2011)
Naadodigal 2 (2020)

References

External links
 
 
 

Living people
Telugu film score composers
Tamil film score composers
Telugu playback singers
Malayalam film score composers
Malayalam playback singers
Tamil playback singers
Indian male playback singers
Indian male composers
Film musicians from Andhra Pradesh
Male film score composers
Year of birth missing (living people)